Hermann Wilken (1522 in Neuenrade – 7 February 1603 in Heidelberg), also known as Hermann Witekind and with the pseudonym of Augustin Lercheimer, was a German humanist and mathematician.

Biography
Originary of Neuenrade, in Westphalia, he studied in Frankfurt (Oder) (1545/46) and in Wittenberg (1547), where he was an alumn of Philipp Melanchthon. In 1552 Wilken was recommended by him to teach at the Latin Cathedral School in Riga, becoming rector in 1554. In 1561 he studied at the University of Rostock and in 1563 he became professor of Greek language in the Faculty of Arts at the University of Heidelberg.

In 1585 he published, under the pseudonym of Augustine Lercheimer, "Christlich bedenken und erinnerung von Zauberey" (i.e.: Christian memory about witchcraft), his book against the persecution of witches. Some witchcraft theorists, as Johann Georg Gödelmann and Anton Praetorius, were influenced by Wilken.

References

External links
 Hermann Wilken at historicum.net
 Literature about Hermann Wilken on the German National Library

1522 births
1603 deaths
German humanists
16th-century German mathematicians
People from Märkischer Kreis
Scientists from Heidelberg
17th-century German mathematicians